Latifa Labida ( – born 1953, Ouazzane) is a Moroccan politician. Between 2007 and 2012, she was Secretary of State for Education in the cabinet of Abbas El Fassi.

Latifa Labida started her career as a schoolteacher in Rabat's primary schools between 1973 and 1977, then in secondary schools between 1977 and 1985, when she changed career joining the Ministry of Economy and Finance in Rabat as a "finance inspector".

See also
Cabinet of Morocco

References

Government ministers of Morocco
1953 births
Living people
People from Ouazzane
Moroccan schoolteachers
Moroccan civil servants
20th-century Moroccan educators